Mong Kok is an area of Hong Kong with the highest population density in the world.

Mong Kok may also refer to:

Mong Kok East station, originally Mong Kok KCR Station
Mong Kok station